Molecular Dynamics of Mixtures (MDynaMix) is a computer software package for general purpose molecular dynamics to simulate mixtures of molecules, interacting by AMBER- and CHARMM-like force fields in periodic boundary conditions.
Algorithms are included for NVE, NVT, NPT, anisotropic NPT ensembles, and Ewald summation to treat electrostatic interactions.
The code was written in a mix of Fortran 77 and 90 (with Message Passing Interface (MPI) for parallel execution). The package runs on Unix and Unix-like (Linux) workstations, clusters of workstations, and on Windows in sequential mode.

MDynaMix is developed at the Division of Physical Chemistry, Department of Materials and Environmental Chemistry, Stockholm University, Sweden. It is released as open-source software under a GNU General Public License (GPL).

Programs
 md is the main MDynaMix block
 makemol is a utility which provides help to create files describing molecular structure and the force field
 tranal is a suite of utilities to analyze trajectories
 mdee is a version of the program which implements expanded ensemble method to compute free energy and chemical potential (is not parallelized)
 mge provides a graphical user interface to construct molecular models and monitor dynamics process

Field of application 
 Thermodynamic properties of liquids
 Nucleic acid - ions interaction
 Modeling of lipid bilayers
 Polyelectrolytes
 Ionic liquids
 X-ray spectra of liquid water
 Force Field development

See also

References

External links 
 
 Ascalaph, graphical shell for MDynaMix (GNU GPL)

Molecular dynamics software
Free science software
Free software programmed in C++
Free software programmed in Fortran